Mal Roche (born in Coventry) is an English retired football forward who played seven seasons in the American Soccer League and at least one in the Major Indoor Soccer League. He was the 1977 ASL Rookie of the Year and the 1980 ASL Leading Scorer.

Youth
Born in England, Roche grew up in California where he became a U.S. citizen in the early 1970s. He attended the University of San Francisco where he played on the men's soccer team from 1973 to 1976. He was a member of the Don's 1975 and 1976 NCAA championship teams. USF inducted Roche into the school's Athletic Hall of Fame in 2002. Roche also played for the San Francisco Athletic Club's soccer team during the mid to late 1970s.

Professional
In 1977, Roche signed with the Sacramento Spirits of the American Soccer League. He tied for fourth on the goals list with thirteen and was named Rookie of the Year. In 1978, he moved to the Los Angeles Skyhawks which went to the championship game, only to fall to the New York Apollo. He had a drop in goal scoring during the 1979 season and at the end of the season, the Skyhawks collapsed. In 1980, the Golden Gate Gales selected Roche in the Skyhawks' dispersal draft and he saw a return to form, leading the league in scoring with 17 goals. The Gales, like the Skyhawks before them, collapsed at the end of the season and Roche moved to the Carolina Lightnin' for the 1981 season. He scored only eight goals in 1981, but gained his first championship as the Lightnin' defeated New York United in the championship game. The Lightnin' and the ASL collapsed at the end of the 1983 season. Roche spent at least part of the 1983-1984 Major Indoor Soccer League season with the St. Louis Steamers. In 1984, Roche played for the San Francisco Glens which won the San Francisco Soccer Football League title that year.

Yearly Awards
 ASL Rookie of the Year - 1977
 ASL Top Goal Scorer - 1980 (17 Goals)
 ASL Top Points Scorer - 1980 (41 Points)

References

External links
 MISL stats

American soccer players
American Soccer League (1933–1983) players
Carolina Lightnin' players
British emigrants to the United States
English footballers
Association football forwards
Golden Gate Gales players
Los Angeles Skyhawks players
Major Indoor Soccer League (1978–1992) players
Footballers from Coventry
Sacramento Gold (1976–1980) players
San Francisco Dons men's soccer players
San Francisco Glens players
St. Louis Steamers (original MISL) players
Living people
English expatriate sportspeople in the United States
Expatriate soccer players in the United States
English expatriate footballers
Year of birth missing (living people)
Soccer players from California